Hybrid Theory Conferences were a series of academic conferences held at Yale University from 1997 through 2001.

The Hybrid Theory Conferences were started in New Haven at Yale University during the late 1990s, and held during the last week in April 1997, 1998, 1999, 2000 and 2001. It was founded by students from within the Comparative Literature, Physics, and Philosophy Departments, who took to calling themselves Hybridists.

History
The Hybrid Theory Conferences at Yale explored the convergence, inter-penetration and consequent hybridization of traditional and emergent communication mediums. The Conference founders initiated the series as a vehicle for (1) fueling the birth of new hybridized communication mediums and technologies, (2) developing new hybrid theories to explore the mutating hybridized social, cultural and economic forms enabled by these emergent mediums, and (3) as a  localized attempt to break down the walls said to exist between town and gown: the Yale University community and the Town of New Haven's inhabitants and workers. Speakers at the different conference events included members of the Yale community (including professors, graduate students and plant operation workers), leading entrepreneurs behind local internet and software start-ups, futurists, media and marketing consultants, local businessmen, landlords, politicians, union representatives from Bridgeport Brewing, townspeople from New Haven and many others. The diversity of the speakers and the audiences at the Hybrid Theory Conference was both a sign of the Conference success reinvigorating the format of public speaking and an expression of the founders stated belief that the standard academic conference format contributed to the belief amongst non-academics that theory was either irrelevant or a "dying body."

Format
The format of the conferences were derived in part from the Situationist International and French Surrealism and differed each year. Presentations at the second conference in 1998 were restricted to 3, 5, 10, or 20 minute durations. By radically shortening presentations down to nothing more than a couple of gestures entwined around a sentence or two in some cases, the Hybridists attempted to remove the long wait for meaning typical of the academic setting and reconnect conferences to more succinct and effectual public spectacles such as the boxing match or directing traffic. In part they saw the trope of Parataxis infecting the contemporary media landscape, and thought it was under represented in the Academy.

Themes
The Conferences were loosely ordered around themes. The advertised themes were:
1997: "Christ and the Shore: The Littoral Dollar"
1998: "Circularity and Odor: Olfactory Gaming"
1999: "Diabetics and Terroristics: the Hostage Twinky"
2000: "Heidegger, God, and Ayn Rand"
2001: "Marketing Alan Ginsberg"

Presentations
Presentations by Jonathan Bernstein, Kjell Otterness, Lance Duerfahrd, Marc Feldman, Frank Greco, Henry Pickford, David Procuniar, Anders Otterness, Susanna Slocum, Michelle Tupko, Wayne Tvedt, and others.

Attendance
Every presentation was preceded by a lengthy toast that in some instances exceeded the length of the paper.

External links
Related Groups & Events:

Yale Faculty Seminar on Media Theory and History: https://web.archive.org/web/20110827113124/http://yalecollege.yale.edu/content/media-theory-and-history

Yale Media Studies Collective: https://web.archive.org/web/20120402185757/http://ymsc.commons.yale.edu/

Yale Media Theory and History Graduate Conference:  https://web.archive.org/web/20110407005040/http://mediaconference.commons.yale.edu/

Yale CMI2 - The Center for media and Instructional Innovation:  https://web.archive.org/web/20110924064242/http://cmii.yale.edu/

Digital Humanities At Yale (a working group of the Whitney Humanities Center):  http://digitalhumanities.yale.edu/

Yale University